Crocus danfordiae  is a species of flowering plant in the genus Crocus of the family Iridaceae. It is a cormous perennial native to central and southern Turkey.

References

danfordiae